Muhammad Bakhtiar bin Wan Chik (Jawi: محمد بختيار بن وان چيق; born 22 May 1965) is a Malaysian politician who has served as the Member of Parliament (MP) for Balik Pulau since May 2018. He served as the Deputy Minister of Tourism, Arts and Culture in the Pakatan Harapan (PH) administration under former Prime Minister Mahathir Mohamad and former Minister Mohammadin Ketapi from July 2018 to the collapse of the PH administration in February 2020. He is a member of the People's Justice Party (PKR), a component party of the PH coalition.

Election results

Honours
  :
 Officer of the Order of the Defender of State (DSPN) – Dato' (2021)

References

External links

Living people
1965 births
People from Penang
Malaysian people of Malay descent
Malaysian Muslims
People's Justice Party (Malaysia) politicians
Members of the Dewan Rakyat
Government ministers of Malaysia
21st-century Malaysian politicians